Wall Valley is an upland valley next east of Priscu Valley in Olympus Range; Minotaur Pass is at the head between Apollo Peak and Mount Electra. The valley opens north to McKelvey Valley. Named by Advisory Committee on Antarctic Names (US-ACAN) (2004) after Diana Wall, Natural Resources Ecology Laboratory, Colorado State University, Fort Collins, CO; United States Antarctic Program (USAP) soils biologist in the McMurdo Dry Valleys, 13 field seasons, 1989–2002, most of them as a principal investigator in the McMurdo Dry Valleys Long-term Ecological Research program (MCM LTER).

Valleys of Victoria Land
McMurdo Dry Valleys